The Moose River is a small river in Vermont of United States of America. It flows into the Passumpsic River at St. Johnsbury, and is part of the Connecticut River basin.

The river is measured by a flow gauge at Victory.  One of the shortest rivers in the United States,
 the Moose is used for whitewater rafting.

References

Rivers of Vermont